Alessandro Gogna (born 29 July 1946) is a mountaineer, adventurer and mountain guide from Italy.

Biography 
Born in Genoa, Italy, he is one of the key figures of Italian mountaineering, both as an active climber and as one of the foremost writers about the mountain world. He has lived and described the transition from classic mountaineering to modern climbing.

The first ascents were on the mountains of his native Liguria. His interest moved to the walls of the Dolomites and he has since climbed in all possible environments, from sea level to the high camps of K2. He count over 500 new climbs in Italy.

He still is one of the international guarantors of Mountain Wilderness having been among the founders.

In 1981, Alessandro Gogna, with Maurizio Zanolla, climbed the Aguglia of Goloritzè in Sardinia, initiating the original development of the Selvaggio Blua trekking route.

Notable ascents 
1967: Scarason (Alpi Liguri), NE wall, first ascent
1968: Pizzo Badile, NE wall, route Cassin, first winter ascent
1968: Grandes Jorasses, N wall, route Cassin, first solo ascent
1969: Grand Capucin, SE wall, Diretta dei Ragni, first winter ascent
1969: Monte Rosa, Macugnaga E wall, via dei Francesi, first solo ascent
1969: Matterhorn, Naso di Z’Mutt first ascent
1970: Grivola, NE wall, via Cretier, first winter ascent
1970: IIa Pala di S. Lucano, SW wall, first ascent
1970: Marmolada, S wall, first ascent direct route
1971: Pilier d'Angle, full Peutérey ridge, first winter ascent
1971: Cima di Terranova Monte Civetta, NW wall, first ascent direct route
1972: IIIa Pala di San Lucano, W wall, first ascent
1972: Brenta Alta, NE ridge, first ascent
1972: Grandes Jorasses, S wall, first ascent
1972: Aiguille de Leschaux, NE wall, first ascent direct route
1974: IIa Pala di San Lucano, E wall, first ascent
1974: IVa Pala di San Lucano, S wall, first ascent
1974: Campanile dei Zoldani (Moiazza), W wall, first ascent direct route
1974: Palazza (Monti del Sole), SW wall, first ascent
1981: Guglia di Goloritzé, first ascent ever
1984: Liss dal Pesgunfi (Val Màsino), E wall, first ascent
2005: Cima di Pino Sud (Col Nudo), E wall, first ascent

Expeditions 
1973: Annapurna, attempt on the NW ridge
1975: Lhotse, S wall, attempt
1978: El Capitan (California), Salathé route, first Italian climb
1979: K2, Abruzzi spur

Other activities 
Speaker (400 talks in Italy and worldwide, starting 1968 until today)
Writer, about 200 articles on magazines, newspaper, web
Trekking tour leader in Asia and Africa, dal 1972 al 1978
creator and coordinator of outstanding initiatives, such as: Clean Marmolada, Free K2, Save the Glaciers, Levissima for Everest, Club Alpino Italiano cleanup of Baltoro Glacier, ecc.

Selected bibliography 
Alessandro Gogna has written over 40 books, in many languages, and co-authored many more.
Gogna, A., Grandes Jorasses Sperone Walker (Tamari, Nordpress, 1999) 
Gogna, A., Un alpinismo di ricerca (Dall’Oglio, 1975)
Gogna, A. Reinhold Messner, K2 (De Agostini, 1980) 
Gogna, A., La parete (Zanichelli, 1981)
Gogna, A., Cento nuovi mattini (Zanichelli, 1981)
Gogna, A., Mezzogiorno di pietra (Zanichelli, 1982)
Gogna, A., Rock story (Edizioni Melograno, 1983)
Gogna, A., Cento pareti di ghiaccio nelle Alpi (Zanichelli, 1984)
Gogna, A., A piedi in Valtellina (De Agostini, 1984)
Gogna, A., Dal Pizzo Badile al Bernina (Zanichelli, 1986)
Gogna, A., Sentieri verticali (Zanichelli, 1987)
Gogna, A., Mesolcina - Spluga (CAI - TCI, 1999)
 Gogna, A., K2. Uomini. Esplorazioni. Imprese 
Gogna, A., I Grandi Spazi delle Alpi (8 volumes) 
Gogna, A., Le Montagne più belle (11 volumes), La Stampa - Priuli&Verlucca, 2006 e 2008 
Gogna, A., La verità obliqua di Severino Casara (with Italo Zandonella, Priuli&Verlucca, 2009) 
Gogna, A., Insieme in vetta, (with Raggio, A. Mondadori 2013)

See also 
List of climbers

Sources

External links
Intervista su Alpinia
Intervista sull'Espresso
Gruppo GISM 
Trentofilmfestival 
La Feltrinelli
K3 Photo agency co-owner. One of the most complete archives of mountain photo: over 100'000 images of the Alps and of other mountains worldwide.
personal website

1946 births
Sportspeople from Genoa
Italian mountain climbers
Free soloists
Living people